Kenneth George Shadie  (8 December 1935 – 29 June 2020) was an Australian screenwriter, who co-wrote the Academy Award-nominated screenplay for the film Crocodile Dundee with Paul Hogan and John Cornell.

Biography
Shadie was born in the Sydney suburb of Bondi and raised in Lane Cove. He was the son of Albert Nicholas Shadie, who was of Lebanese Christian descent, and Edith (née Rayner) from Manchester, England. From 1964 to 1968, he was chief writer and script editor of The Mavis Bramston Show. He worked on its follow up News Revue.

In 1974, he was a script writer for the soap opera Number 96.

In the late 1970s he was writing a revue for Ron Frazer. This was seen by Paul Hogan who loved the writing and asked to meet Shadie. They two of them started writing together on The Paul Hogan Show.

Hogan, Shadie and Cornell co-wrote the script for the film Crocodile Dundee, which went on to become a massive hit in Australia and abroad, with the screenplay nominated for the Academy Award for Best Original Screenplay in 1986.

In the late 1980s Ken Shadie wrote the first draft of the movie version of The Phantom.

Shadie was awarded the Medal of the Order of Australia (OAM) in the Queen's Birthday Honours in 2015, for service to the film and television industries as a writer, and to veterans (for his community work as president of the Brooklyn sub-branch of the Returned and Services League of Australia).

Shadie died at the age of 84, on 29 June 2020.

References

External links
 
 

1935 births
2020 deaths
Australian screenwriters
Recipients of the Medal of the Order of Australia
Australian people of Lebanese descent
Writers from Sydney